Rockcliffe Park Public School (RPPS) is a public elementary school in the Rockcliffe Park neighbourhood of Ottawa, Ontario, Canada.

History
The school was founded in 1922. The school is located in the centre of Ottawa's wealthiest neighbourhood. Near the school are Ottawa's two most prominent private schools, Elmwood School and Ashbury College, to which many students move after Rockcliffe.

Rockcliffe Park Public School has long educated the children of politicians and ambassadors. Perhaps the most prominent former students are Princess Beatrix and Princess Irene, who attended the school while the Dutch Royal Family was in exile during the Second World War. Former Prime Minister Stephen Harper's daughter attended the school, as did his son, the three sons of Pierre Trudeau, including the current Prime Minister Justin Trudeau and the children of John Turner. Actor Matthew Perry also attended the school.

Programs
As well as Rockcliffe and neighbouring New Edinburgh, the school also draws students from the Lower Town and Sandy Hill areas of Ottawa, for its French immersion program, in which the majority of students are enrolled. The school is also well known for its annual Book Fair, a used book sale that has acted as a fundraiser for the school for 51 years. Rockcliffe is twinned with Mokoena Primary School in Butha-Buthe, Lesotho. This twinning is helped by the organization Help Lesotho. Rockcliffe Park is the first school in Canada to twin with another school in Lesotho.

Since the school has a major relationship to the Dutch Royal Family, the Embassy of the Netherlands in Ottawa is partnered with the school.

Further reading
Edmond, Martha (2005). Rockcliffe Park: A History of the Village. Ottawa: Published by The Friends of the Village of Rockcliffe Park Foundation, pgs. 228 - 239
Hughes, Graham. "This School is a True Slice of Society." The Ottawa Citizen. Friday, January 27, 2006. pg. F3

References

External links

Official site
Rockcliffe Book Fair

Elementary schools in Ottawa
French immersion schools in Canada
Educational institutions established in 1922
1922 establishments in Ontario